Balquhain Castle is a ruined tower house in Aberdeenshire, Scotland. It was the stronghold of the Leslies of Balquhain.

History
The castle was built in the 14th century and held by Leslie’s family from 1340. On 5 July 1441 John Leslie of Balquhain made an indenture with four masons, David Hardgat, David Dun, Robert Masoun and Gilbert Masoun that they would complete his building work.

The castle was sacked during a feud with the Forbes family in 1526. The castle was rebuilt in 1530. Mary Queen of Scots in 1562 stayed at the castle prior to the Battle of Corrichie. It was burned by the forces of Prince William, Duke of Cumberland in 1746 and was abandoned.

The castle
The tower measures , and is surrounded by the remains of a barmkin.

Notes

References

External links
https://web.archive.org/web/20060820100206/http://www.clanleslie.org/Castles4.html

Scheduled Ancient Monuments in Aberdeenshire
Ruined castles in Aberdeenshire
Clan Leslie
Inverurie